Teresa Bustamante (born 17 November 1962) is an Argentine alpine skier. She competed in three events at the 1984 Winter Olympics.

References

1962 births
Living people
Argentine female alpine skiers
Olympic alpine skiers of Argentina
Alpine skiers at the 1984 Winter Olympics
Sportspeople from Bariloche